American actor, director, and producer John Malkovich has appeared in more than 70 motion pictures. He started acting in the 1980s, appearing in the films Places in the Heart (1984) with Sally Field, Death of a Salesman (1985), The Glass Menagerie (1987), Empire of the Sun (1987), and Dangerous Liaisons (1988) with Glenn Close. His role in Places in the Heart earned him an Academy Award nomination. During the 1990s, he starred in the films Of Mice and Men (1992) as Lennie Small, In the Line of Fire (1993) as Mitch Leary, Beyond the Clouds (1995) as The Director, The Portrait of a Lady (1996) as Gilbert Osmond, Con Air (1997) as Cyrus "The Virus" Grissom, The Man in the Iron Mask (1998) as Athos, Being John Malkovich (1999) as John Horatio Malkovich, and The Messenger: The Story of Joan of Arc (1999) as Charles VII. His role as Mitch Leary in In the Line of Fire earned him his second Academy Award nomination.

Malkovich went on to appear in the early 2000s films Johnny English (2003) as Pascal Sauvage, The Libertine (2004) as Charles II, The Hitchhiker's Guide to the Galaxy (2005) as Humma Kavula, Eragon (2006) as Galbatorix, Klimt (2006) as Gustav Klimt, Burn After Reading (2008) as Osborne Cox, and Changeling (2008) as Reverend Briegleb. In 2010, he co-starred with Josh Brolin and Megan Fox in the science fiction Western Jonah Hex as Quentin Turnbull. The same year, he also starred in Secretariat with Diane Lane, and RED with Bruce Willis, Morgan Freeman and Helen Mirren, a role he later reprised in the sequel RED 2 (2013). Malkovich made an appearance in the science fiction action film Transformers: Dark of the Moon (2011) as Bruce Brazos. He co-starred in the romantic zombie comedy film Warm Bodies (2013) as General Grigio and lent his voice to the animated movie Penguins of Madagascar (2014) as the villainous octopus Dave.

As a producer, Malkovich has produced the films Ghost World (2001), The Libertine (2004), Juno (2007), and The Perks of Being a Wallflower (2012).

Film

Television

Video games

Music videos

Director
The Dancer Upstairs (2002)
Hideous Man (2002)

Writer
Hideous Man (2002)
100 Years (2015, for a 2115 release)

Producer
The Accidental Tourist (1988) (executive producer)
Ghost World (2001)
The Dancer Upstairs (2002)
The Libertine (2004)
Kill the Poor (2006)
Art School Confidential (2006)
Juno (2007)
Young Adult (2011) (executive producer)
The Perks of Being a Wallflower (2012)
César Chávez (2013) (executive producer)
Demolition (2015) (executive producer)
The Wilde Wedding (2017) (executive producer)
Shattered (2022)

References

External links
 

Malkovich, John
Malkovich, John
Malkovich, John